Vijay Suriya (born 7 September 1990, Bangalore, India) is an Indian actor and presenter who shot to fame with the television series Agnisakshi aired on Colors Kannada.

Early life and career
Suriya did his schooling at Clarence Public School and his PU at Christ University, in Bangalore. He pursued his acting degree in Whistling Woods Academy, Mumbai. He has an elder brother who stays in Dubai . He married a family friend and an IT professional Chaitra.S on 14 February 2019 ↵Vijay debuted alongside Harshika Poonacha in 2012, with the movie Crazy Loka. The movie was directed by Kavitha Lankesh and he played the role of Ravichandran's son, Vijay rose to fame by 2014 from Agnisakshi (Kannada serial) a daily serial which airs on Colors Kannada.  He has worked with Dr Nagathihalli Chandrasheka Ishtakamya, released in May 2016. His movie "Sa" with Karthik Jayaram and Samyukta Hornad released in August 2016.  In 2019, he had a movie release titled "Kaddu Muchchi". Vijay was also the host of "Comedy Talkies", a comedy show judged by Srujan Lokesh and Rachitha Ram. After "Premaloka" from July 2019-October 2020, Vijay Suriya has been working on an untitled IT based film and Veeraputra.

Filmography

Films

Television

Awards
Won- Anubandha Award for Best Pair along with VaishnaviWon- Anubandha Award for Best Actor in a Leading Role 2014-15Won- Anubandha Award for Best Actor in a Leading Role 2016-17Won – Anubandha Award for Best Actor in a Leading Role 2017-18Won – Anubandha Award for Best Actor in a Leading Role 2018-19

References

External links

Kannada male actors
Indian male television actors
Indian male film actors
1992 births
Living people
21st-century Indian male actors
Christ University alumni